The Valladolid International Film Festival, popularly known as Seminci (short for), is a film festival held annually in Valladolid, Spain. It stands out in the area of films d'auteur and independent films.

The Seminci conventionally takes place every October, about a month later than the San Sebastián Film Festival, the most prestigious film festival in Spain.

History

The first edition of the festival began on 20 March 1956 under the name of Semana de Cine Religioso de Valladolid with a goal of promoting Catholic moral values in conjunction with the celebration of Holy Week in Valladolid. For the first two years it was not competitive and no prizes were awarded. In 1958 the Don Bosco gold and silver awards and the Special Mention appeared, which the following year were replaced by the Lábaro and the Ciudad de Valladolid Award, respectively.

The films to be shown were already selected according to quality and not quantity criteria, even if that meant having an insufficient number of films. Starting in 1960, the festival was renamed Semana Internacional de Cine Religioso y de Valores Humanos (the International Week of Religious Cinema and Human Values) and the theme of the films was expanded, accepting those in which human and committed values prevailed. That year the Golden Spike also began to be awarded, alongside the existing prizes and (since 1961) the San Gregorio Prize.

In 1973 the festival adopted its current name, due to the progressive increase in the films in competition and increased interest from producers. The following year the Lábaro disappeared and the Espiga became the main award. Subsequently, the awards for best actor and actress (1979), best screenplay (1984), best first film (1989), the Jury (1991) and the best new director (1992), among others, were introduced.

Golden Spike 

A list displaying some of the winners is as follows:

Acknowledgments 
In 2016 the Seminci was recognized with the Castilla y León Prize for the Arts, the highest institutional award from the region of Castile and León.

Informational notes

References
Citations

Bibliography

External links
 Official website

Film festivals in Spain
Valladolid
1956 establishments in Spain
Awards established in 1956
Events in Castile and León
October events